Jonathan Charles Poole (born 16 October 1969), also known by his stage name Random Jon Poole, is an English multi-instrumentalist singer and songwriter. He is best known for his work as guitarist for Cardiacs and as bass player for the Wildhearts and Lifesigns.

Poole is the frontman and main performer of God Damn Whores, and has also worked with the bands Ablemesh, Dr Brighton and Celebricide. He is currently the live bass player for the Lotus Eaters and has joined the Brighton band La Momo as drummer. He also fronts the Dowling Poole along with Willie Dowling, and has released three albums and a number of EPs with this project.

Career

Cangels Close Crew and Ad Nauseam (1980s)

After a move to Milton Keynes circa 1990, Poole wrote and performed in his first proper band, the Cardiacs-inspired Ad Nauseam alongside lead singer and drummer Bob Leith. Although Ad Nauseam had a shifting lineup Poole played, at various times, most of the instruments in the band.

Ad Nauseam split up a short time after Poole's recruitment into Cardiacs. Poole has since expressed interest in an Ad Nauseam reunion, saying "I'd really like to do it if only to get it right this time but I don't know if it'll ever happen. I don't even know if it'd be the same line-up. Me and Bob would be there of course as it was always our band. I had a brief thought of doing a set of Ad Nauseam songs with some more obscure Cardiacs songs chucked in such as "Bitter Pill" "Big Noise In A Toy World"  or "Stench Of Honey" but I'm not sure if that might just be naff."

Cardiacs (1991–2004)
Poole's work with Ad Nauseam (plus relentless "pestering", as a fan) had brought him to the attention of Cardiacs and their leader Tim Smith. On hearing of guitarist Christian 'Bic' Hayes departure from Cardiacs in May 1991, Poole promptly put himself forward as a replacement candidate and was recruited into the band later in the year. (His Ad Nauseam bandmate Bob Leith would also join the band as drummer, replacing the outgoing Dominic Luckman in December 1993.) 
Poole stayed in Cardiacs for the next thirteen years, playing second guitar and singing backing vocals (plus playing keyboards on record). He also played some of the group's bass guitar parts both on record and live (when covering for Cardiacs bass player Jim Smith). He was noted for his parodic tapping-style guitar solos on live performances of the songs "Fiery Gun Hand" and "Anything I Can't Eat".

Poole appeared on two Cardiacs albums (the 1995 double album Sing To God and its 1999 follow-up Guns) as well as on the song "Faster Than Snakes With A Ball And A Chain" from Greatest Hits album. He is one of the only Cardiacs members to have entire Cardiacs songs credited to him (including concert favourite "A Horse's Tail"), the others being Tim Smith and Colvin Mayers (who wrote the song "Food on the Wall" from the 1979 7" single "A Bus for a Bus on the Bus"), though this is from the period of which the band went by Cardiac Arrest. Poole also co-wrote songs with Smith and Leith and was also credited with co-writing riffs and arrangements on Smith's own songs.

Poole left the band amicably in 2004 due to other musical commitments, and has remained a friend and fan.

Two Worlds Collide (1992–unspecified date in 1990s)
On joining Cardiacs, Poole befriended the band's guitar technician - the former Alternative TV guitarist Clive Giblin was hired as the band's guitar technician - and was subsequently drawn into a Giblin songwriting project "specifically designed to put the listener on edge." This project became Two Worlds Collide, which Poole contributed to using virtually every instrument he played (initially guitar and keyboards, followed by bass guitar and finally, in a later line-up) drums). Two Cardiacs drummers - Bob Leith and Dominic Luckman - also played drums for the project at various times.

During Poole's tenure, Two Worlds Collide recorded the Sympathetic Storm album (eventually released in 2006 by the Le Cluricaun label.) but did not play live due to the members' other commitments. Although Poole left the band during the 1990s, Two Worlds Collide (currently managed by former Public Image Ltd publicist Helen Maleed) has continued with a lineup of Giblin, Leith and Marina Young, working on a second album and live performances.

Ablemesh and Dr Brighton (1990s)
While still a member of Cardiacs, Poole also played and worked with Ablemesh, a Milton Keynes art-rock band centred on singer/publicist Gordon Glass, guitarist/lyricist Sean Walmsley and drummer/photographer Wig Worland. (Other members of the band during its 1991-1996 lifespan included drummers Bob Leith and Mark Turner, bass players Andy Allum, Sujay Jayaram and Allan Thompson, and keyboard player Mike Turbutt.) Fiercely independent, Ablemesh practised a multimedia approach to their combined art and explored various new ways of reaching an audience. This included a distribution experiment anticipating the later practise of viral distribution, in which the band's 1992 Shareware EP was produced in an extremely limited run of three CDs only, with the CD's recipients simply invited to copy the music onto cassette free of charge and to pass it on. The band repeated the experiment with the follow-up EP Fecund. They also explored a related promotion idea by exploiting a loophole in the law which effectively allowed them to place dummy Ablemesh cassette releases on the shelves of the record departments of mainstream retailers such as Woolworths (each dummy copy contained an insert telling the reader where they can get mail order copies).

Poole's main involvement with Ablemesh was in 1995, when he played bass guitar with the band, apparently "reinvented" many of their songs and produced their album Present Imperfect. The latter was recorded entirely on an analogue cassette 4-track machine using Poole's determined and innovative production skills. The album remained unreleased until 2006 when a remastered version was made available as a download via the Ablemesh homepage.

In 1995, Poole and Walmsley formed Dr Brighton, a more straightforward rock band with punk and pop influences. Poole fronted the band, sharing guitar and vocal duties with Walmsley (with whom he also wrote the songs). The rest of the band were current or former Ablemesh members - Allum on bass guitar, Turbutt on keyboards and percussion and Leith on drums. The band recorded a number of tracks and played live, but did not release any albums or singles.

Silver Ginger 5, the Wildhearts, Ginger & the Sonic Circus (2000–2005 plus intermittent reunions)
In 2000, due to Cardiacs' influence on (and friendly relationship with) the Wildhearts, Poole began to work with Wildhearts leader Ginger on the latter's spin-off project Silver Ginger 5. Poole played on the Black Leather Mojo album (produced by Tim Smith) and joined the Silver Ginger 5 live band as bass player. It was on the first day of Silver Ginger 5 rehearsals that Poole gained his nickname of "Random Jon".

Poole's work with Silver Ginger 5 led directly to him joining the Wildhearts in 2003 (replacing Danny McCormack on bass). This move ultimately led to him leaving Cardiacs in 2004 due to the demands of the Wildhearts' touring schedule. When the Wildhearts split up again in 2005, Poole continued to play as part of Ginger's band Ginger & the Sonic Circus and on Ginger's solo tours and albums. He rejoined The Wildhearts in December 2012 when the Wildhearts reformed for Ginger's annual Birthday Bash. He played live with the Wildhearts in 2013 and in 2014-2017.

God Damn Whores (2005–present)
After leaving the Wildhearts in 2005, Poole created the God Damn Whores, a glam punk/hard rock band centred on himself as lead vocalist and guitarist. The band has a flexible lineup which Poole describes as "just me and anyone else who happens to be available." At various times the God Damn Whores has featured Ginger, Wolfsbane guitarist Jase Edwards, Chris Catalyst (The Sisters of Mercy/Eureka Machines) and Ginger's drummer Denzel. God Damn Whores have supported both Cardiacs and the Wildhearts on tour.

The band's first album, We Are the Lucky Thirteen, was released on Round Records. Poole later described this recording as "a bit of fun" and stated that it would be entirely eclipsed by the follow-up ("a very tribal/glam/psychedelic affair.") On 19 October 2012, Poole launched the second God Damn Whores album, Heya Heya Heya Heya Ho! via PledgeMusic. releasing the album on 29 December 2012. On this release, Poole played all instruments although some guitar solos were contributed by Jase Edwards.

Other collaborations (Crayola Lectern, La Momo, Celebricide, The Lotus Eaters)
Poole has been involved in several Brighton-based collaborations with fellow psychedelic/experimental rock musician Chris Anderson. Since 2008, Poole has been part of Anderson's psychedelic rock project Crayola Lectern, in which he plays Casio synthesizer. Since 2009, Poole has played drums for La Momo (which features Anderson on guitar). During 2006, Poole drummed for Celebricide, which featured two of his future La Momo bandmates (both Chris Anderson and Sadie Fredericks).

In June 2009, Poole announced that he had joined the cult 1980s indie rock band the Lotus Eaters as bass player. He performed at their concert at the Liverpool Philharmonic on 25 July that year.

In April 2014, a PledgeMusic preorder campaign was launched for a new project called the Dowling Poole, a power pop band whose influences are quoted as 10cc, the Beatles and XTC, among others. The project sees Poole teaming up with Willie Dowling, who had been the frontman of Honeycrack and Jackdaw4, and had played as a session keyboardist with the Wildhearts in the mid-1990s.  The album Bleak Strategies was released on 11 August 2014 through 369Music, to highly positive reviews. In 2016, the Dowling Poole released another well-received album, One Hyde Park. On the studio recordings, Poole is responsible for bass and drums, and also contributes vocals and guitar along with Dowling.

In 2017, Poole joined Dr Hook Starring Dennis Locorriere.

Musical style and influences
Poole's projects tend to draw from or combine punk rock, progressive/art rock and hard rock, mostly due to his manic performance style, punk-style vocals and dual interest in complexity and raw riffs. He has also commented "I find beautiful perfection repellent."

However, Poole has cited a wide range of influences affecting his music, starting with the jazz which his family were all interested in (and played). As a listener, he subsequently became interested in (in rapid succession), contemporary disco and soul, New Wave and 1980s synth pop, and 1960s pop. This was followed by a period "catching up with" punk and post-punk, followed by ska, 2-Tone music and Trevor Horn producer pop. By the mid-to-late 80s, when he was beginning to play in bands, he was listening to maverick American art-rock heroes such as Captain Beefheart, Tom Waits, Frank Zappa and also to British progressive rock from the 1970s (as well as contemporary prog-inspired bands - most notably Cardiacs).

Poole has also expressed interest in a variety of 1990s rock and pop acts including Nirvana, Blur, Sugababes and others. He is a fan of several classical composers - Igor Stravinsky, Erik Satie, Ralph Vaughan Williams and Gustav Holst.

Work as solo artist
In addition to his band projects, Poole has released two albums under his own name.
In 1994, Poole released a particularly ambitious Frank Zappa tribute album Mothers Covers (later renamed What's the Ugliest Part Of Your Body?) which was released in 1994. On this album, Poole performed a surprisingly accurate and effective one-man band rendition of old Mothers of Invention songs using only multiple overdubbed vocal parts, guitars, a Yamaha DX7 synthesizer and a primitive Alesis HR16 drum machine. In January 2003 the album was released as  What's the Ugliest Part of Your Body – The Works of Frank Zappa Circa 1965-69 on Org Records. It was reissued again via Bandcamp in November 2013.

On 19 October 2012, Poole launched his second solo album, Random Jon Poole on PledgeMusic, making the digital version available on 29 December 2012 (with a CD version scheduled for March 2013).

Personal life
Jonathan Charles Poole comes from a musical family and is the youngest of six children, all of whom play musical instruments. One of his brothers is highly regarded session bass player Ed Poole and one of his sisters is jazz trombonist Cathi "Trombabe" Poole, a member of the Cathi Cook Quintet and former musical director of the Milton Keynes Open Band.

References

External links
 
 

1969 births
Living people
English rock bass guitarists
Male bass guitarists
English rock guitarists
English male guitarists
English multi-instrumentalists
Lifesigns members
The Wildhearts members
People from Hemel Hempstead
Musicians from Hertfordshire
Cardiacs members
Silver Ginger 5 members
Ginger & the Sonic Circus members